Tristão de Bragança Cunha (2 April 1891 – 26 September 1958), alternatively spelled as Tristao de Braganza Cunha, popularly known as T B Cunha was a prominent Indian nationalist and anti-colonial activist from Goa (then part of Portuguese India). He is popularly known as the "Father of Goan nationalism", and was the organiser of the first movement to end Portuguese rule in Goa.

Early life and education
Cunha was born on 2 April 1891 in the village Chandor in Goa. He hailed from Cuelim, Cansaulim. He completed his school education in Panjim and then went to Pondicherry to French College for his B.A. and then to Paris. There he studied at the Sorbonne University and obtained a degree in electrical engineering. In Paris, Cunha entered the circle of Romain Rolland and helped publicise the Indian independence movement generally, and the case of Portuguese India in particular, in the French-language press.

Role in  Goa liberation movement (1926–1954)
Cunha returned to Goa in 1926 and he set up the Comissão do Congresso de Goa (Goa Congress Committee) in Goa in 1928 to organise the Goan intelligentsia against Portuguese colonial rule. Pressured by Portuguese authorities, Cunha transferred operations to Bombay and in 1938, affiliated his organisation with the Indian National Congress. He continued publicising the Goan case in a stream of articles and books, denouncing Portuguese rule. Among his publications were booklets Four Hundred Years of Foreign Rule and The Denationalisation of Goans (1944). Cunha was an advocate of Goan identification, political as well as cultural, with greater India.

In 1946, Cunha could not be contacted in those good old days. Communication was poor, to say the least. T B Cunha came to know about the "unrest" in Margao and came to the city the next day. Ram Manohar Lohia had addressed what was arguably the first and largest mass gathering yet, setting in motion the Goa liberation movement on the previous day. Cunha was arrested by the Portuguese authorities. He was kept in dark damp cell at Fort Aguada. He was the first civilian to be tried by a military tribunal. He was court martialled and sentenced to eight years imprisonment. He was deported to the Peniche Fortress in Portugal.

After his release from Portugal in 1954, Cunha returned to Bombay. Cunha formed and headed the Goa Action Committee, to help co-ordinate the numerous Goan organisations that had emerged by this time. He published a newspaper called "Free Goa".

Death 
He died on 26 September 1958, Loknayak Jaiprakash Narayan was one of the pallbearers. The Government of India issued a postage stamp in his honour.

Legacy
The World Peace Council at Stockholm in 1959 posthumously awarded T. B. Cunha a gold medal for his contribution to the cause of "Peace and Friendship among People."

Cunha's mortal remains are housed in an urn at a memorial located in Panaji's Azad Maidan. A prominent road in the city of Panaji is named as "T. B. Cunha Road". A statue of Cunha has been installed in his ancestral village of Cuelim, Cansaulim. A school in Margao and a government higher secondary school in Panaji are also named in Cunha's honour. The campus in Panaji's Altinho which houses the Goa College of Architecture and the Goa College of Music, is named as "Dr. T. B. Cunha Educational Complex".

A sports' complex in Cansaulim, Cuelim is named after him, and his portrait was unveiled in the Indian Parliament in 2011 to commemorate the golden jubilee of Goa's accession to India.

The book The Life & Times of T. B. Cunha by Nishta Desai was published in 2015.

References

External links
Tristao de Braganza Cunha, 1891 ~ 1958 – Father of Goan Nationalism, GOACOM, GOACOM Biography Series

Activists from Goa
1891 births
1958 deaths
University of Paris alumni
Goa liberation activists
People from South Goa district
Portuguese Indian expatriates in France